The ice hockey team rosters at the 1992 Winter Olympics consisted of the following players:

Canada
Dave Archibald, Todd Brost, Sean Burke, Kevin Dahl, Curt Giles, Dave Hannan, Gordon Hynes, Fabian Joseph, Joé Juneau, Trevor Kidd, Patrick Lebeau, Chris Lindberg, Eric Lindros, Kent Manderville, Adrien Plavsic, Dan Ratushny, Sam St. Laurent, Brad Schlegel, Wally Schreiber, Randy Smith, Dave Tippett, Brian Tutt, Jason Woolley

Czechoslovakia
Patrick Augusta, Petr Bříza, Jaromír Dragan, Leo Gudas, Miloslav Hořava, Petr Hrbek, Otakar Janecký, Tomáš Jelínek, Drahomír Kadlec, Kamil Kašťák, Robert Lang, Igor Liba, Ladislav Lubina, František Procházka, Petr Rosol, Bedřich Ščerban, Jiří Šlégr, Richard Šmehlík, Róbert Švehla, Oldřich Svoboda, Radek Ťoupal, Peter Veselovský, Richard Žemlička

Finland
Timo Blomqvist, Kari Eloranta, Raimo Helminen, Hannu Järvenpää, Timo Jutila, Markus Ketterer, Janne Laukkanen, Harri Laurila, Sakari Lindfors, Jari Lindroos, Mikko Mäkelä, Mika Nieminen, Timo Peltomaa, Arto Ruotanen, Timo Saarikoski, Simo Saarinen, Keijo Säilynoja, Teemu Selänne, Ville Sirén, Petri Skriko, Raimo Summanen, Jukka Tammi, Pekka Tuomisto

France
Peter Almásy, Michaël Babin, Stéphane Barin, Stéphane Botteri, Philippe Bozon, Jean-Marc Djian, Patrick Dunn, Gérald Guennelon, Benoît Laporte, Michel LeBlanc, Jean-Philippe Lemoine, Fabrice Lhenry, Pascal Margerit, Denis Perez, Serge Poudrier, Christian Pouget, Pierre Pousse, Antoine Richer, Bruno Saunier, Christophe Ville, Petri Ylönen, Arnaud Briand, Yves Crettenand

Germany
Rick Amann, Thomas Brandl, Andreas Brockmann, Helmut de Raaf, Peter Draisaitl, Ron Fischer, Karl Friesen, Dieter Hegen, Mike Heidt, Joseph Heiß, Uli Hiemer, Raimund Hilger, Georg Holzmann, Axel Kammerer, Udo Kießling, Ernst Köpf, Jörg Mayr, Andreas Niederberger, Jürgen Rumrich, Michael Rumrich, Mike Schmidt, Bernd Truntschka, Gerd Truntschka

Italy
Jim Camazzola, Anthony Circelli, Georg Comploi, Michael De Angelis, David Delfino, Joe Foglietta, Robert Ginnetti, Emilio Iovio, Bob Manno, Giovanni Marchetti, Rick Morocco, Frank Nigro, Robert Oberrauch, Santino Pellegrino, Marco Scapinello, Martino Soracreppa, Bill Stewart, Lucio Topatigh, John Vecchiarelli, Ivano Zanatta, Mike Zanier, Bruno Zarrillo

Norway
Steve Allman, Morgan Andersen, Arne Billkvam, Ole Eskild Dahlstrøm, Jan-Roar Fagerli, Jarle Friis, Martin Friis, Rune Gulliksen, Carl Gunnar Gundersen, Geir Hoff, Tommy Jakobsen, Tom Johansen, Jon-Magne Karlstad, Erik Kristiansen, Ørjan Løvdal, Jim Marthinsen, Øystein Olsen, Eirik Paulsen, Marius Rath, Petter Salsten, Rob Schistad, Kim Søgaard, Petter Thoresen

Poland
Janusz Adamiec, Marek Batkiewicz, Krzysztof Bujar, Marek Cholewa, Mariusz Czerkawski, Dariusz Garbocz, Henryk Gruth, Janusz Hajnos, Kazimierz Jurek, Andrzej Kądziołka, Mariusz Kieca, Waldemar Klisiak, Krzysztof Kuźniecow, Dariusz Płatek, Mariusz Puzio, Gabriel Samolej, Jerzy Sobera, Rafał Sroka, Andrzej Świstak, Robert Szopiński, Wojciech Tkacz, Mirosław Tomasik, Sławomir Wieloch

Sweden
Peter Andersson, Peter Andersson, Charles Berglund, Patrik Carnbäck, Lars Edström, Patrik Erickson, Bengt-Åke Gustafsson, Mikael Johansson, Kenneth Kennholt, Patric Kjellberg, Petri Liimatainen, Håkan Loob, Mats Näslund, Roger Nordström, Peter Ottosson, Thomas Rundqvist, Daniel Rydmark, Börje Salming, Tommy Sjödin, Tommy Söderström, Fredrik Stillman, Jan Viktorsson

Switzerland
Samuel Balmer, Sandro Bertaggia, Andreas Beutler, Patrice Brasey, Mario Brodmann, Manuele Celio, Jörg Eberle, Keith Fair, Doug Honegger, Patrick Howald, Peter Jaks, Dino Kessler, André Künzi, Sven Leuenberger, Alfred Lüthi, Gil Montandon, Reto Pavoni, André Rötheli, Mario Rottaris, Andreas Ton, Renato Tosio, Thomas Vrabec

Unified Team
Sergei Bautin, Igor Boldin, Nikolai Borschevsky, Vyacheslav Butsayev, Vyacheslav Bykov, Evgeni Davydov, Darius Kasparaitis, Nikolai Khabibulin, Yuri Khmylev, Andrei Khomutov, Andrei Kovalenko, Alexei Kovalev, Igor Kravchuk, Vladimir Malakhov, Dmitri Mironov, Sergei Petrenko, Vitali Prokhorov, Mikhail Shtalenkov, Andrei Trefilov, Dmitri Yushkevich, Alexei Zhamnov, Alexei Zhitnik, Sergei Zubov

United States
Greg Brown, Clark Donatelli, Ted Donato, Ted Drury, David Emma, Guy Gosselin, Scott Gordon, Bret Hedican, Steve Heinze, Sean Hill, Jim Johannson, Scott Lachance, Ray LeBlanc, Moe Mantha, Shawn McEachern, Marty McInnis, Joe Sacco, Tim Sweeney, Keith Tkachuk, Dave Tretowicz, C. J. Young, Scott Young

References

Sources

Hockey Hall Of Fame page on the 1992 Olympics

rosters
1992